Hans Dockter, is the founder of Gradle and CEO of Gradle Inc., the international software company behind the Gradle open source build system and the creator of Gradle Enterprise.

References 

Free software programmers